State Highway 49 (SH 49) is a New Zealand state highway, linking  and , via the tourist town of Ohakune. It forms the southern part of the ring road surrounding Tongariro National Park and provides access to the southern side of Mount Ruapehu and the Turoa skifield. It roughly follows the North Island Main Trunk railway.

SH 49 lies entirely within the Ruapehu District.

Route

SH 49 leaves SH 4 at Tohunga Junction, some eight kilometres north of Raetihi, and heads southeast across rolling hills to the tourist town of Ohakune. Following Ohakune's main street, the road continues southeast out of the township, passing Ohakune's famous giant carrot.

SH 49 continues southeast across rolling hills, running broadly in the same direction as the North Island Main Trunk. It passes the rural villages of Rangataua and Karioi, before meeting the railway line at the Whangaehu River at Tangiwai. The bridge here has flashing lights and gates to block off the road in case of a lahar from Mount Ruapehu's crater lake. To the side of the bridge is the Tangiwai memorial, erected to remember the 151 people who died in the Tangiwai disaster when a Wellington to Auckland express train plunged into the river following a lahar on 24 December 1953.

After crossing the Whangaehu River, and the railway line, SH 49 turns east for several kilometres, before turning south into Waiouru. At Waiouru, SH 49 ends at the intersection with SH 1.

Spur
SH 49 used to have one spur; SH 49A. It deviated from SH 49 at Ohakune, and ran west to Raetihi, where it terminated at SH 4. SH 49A was revoked in 1991–92.

Some older New Zealand maps instead have SH 49 running on the section between Ohakune and Raetihi, and SH 49A on the section between Ohakune and Tohunga Junction.

Major intersections

The highway lies entirely within the Ruapehu District.

See also
 List of New Zealand state highways

References

External links
 New Zealand Transport Agency

49
Ruapehu District
Transport in Manawatū-Whanganui